Saeul is a commune and small town in western Luxembourg, in the canton of Redange.

, the town of Saeul itself, which lies in the south-east of the commune, has a population of 298.

Population

References

External links
 

Communes in Redange (canton)
Towns in Luxembourg